Jean-Louis Frenette (21 September 1920 – 9 April 2008) was a Social Credit party member of the House of Commons of Canada. He was an architectural draftsman by career.

He was first elected at the Portneuf riding in the 1962 general election then re-elected there in 1963. After completing his term in the 26th Parliament, he became an independent candidate at Portneuf in the 1965 election but was defeated by Roland Godin of the Ralliement créditiste.

Electoral record

References

External links
 

1920 births
2008 deaths
Members of the House of Commons of Canada from Quebec
Independent MPs in the Canadian House of Commons
Social Credit Party of Canada MPs